Margarita Alexandrovna Miglau (16 March 1926 in Lezye - 18. March 2013 in Moscow) was a Russian opera soprano. One of her major roles was Cio-Cio-San in Madama Butterfly, which she performed 173 times at the Bolshoi Theatre. She also played the role of Varya in the premiere of The Story of a Real Man.

References

1926 births
2013 deaths
People from Kirovsky District, Leningrad Oblast
Russian operatic sopranos
Soviet sopranos
Soviet women opera singers